This is a list of episodes from the third season of the 1967 Dragnet series. The season was directed by Jack Webb.

Broadcast history
The season originally aired Thursday at 9:30-10:00 pm (EST).

DVD release
The DVD was released by Shout! Factory.

Episodes

Dragnet (1967 series) (season 3)